The 1902 South Australian Football Association season was the 26th season of the top-level Australian rules football competition in South Australia.

The 1902 premiership was won by the  Football Club for the second time. Minor premier  was disqualified from the Finals and relegated to third overall after refusing to play the second semi-final against  due to a dispute over the umpire chosen. , in its second season, received its second consecutive wooden spoon.

Minor Round

Round 1

Ladder

Finals Series 
After three seasons of using major round systems involving all clubs, the SAFA adopted the Argus finals system involving only the top four teams for the first time.

First Semi-final

Second Semi-final
  

The second semi-final was forfeited by Port Adelaide owing to its objection to the appointment of umpire Phil Kneebone to the match. South Adelaide played a hastily arranged exhibition match against North Adelaide to entertain the spectators who had turned up.

Kneebone had been an SAFA umpire up to the 1901 season, but had not returned in 1902. Late in the season, in response to a shortage of umpires, the SAFA umpire committee had made a resolution to extend an invitation to Kneebone, which Kneebone had declined. Still facing a shortage of available first-rate umpires for the second semi-final, the committee appointed Kneebone, which he this time accepted. Port Adelaide objected to this on two grounds: procedural in that the committee had not passed a new resolution to invite or appoint Kneebone – the committee held that the previous resolution to invite had not lapsed, even though the invite itself had been rejected – and that the club was dissatisfied with Kneebone's performances in previous seasons. Port Adelaide advised the SAFA on the Saturday before the match of its intention to forfeit if Kneebone's appointment stood. The SAFA did not acquiesce, and on the day of the match, Port Adelaide formally forfeited in writing.

At the time of its forfeiture, Port Adelaide as minor premier was entitled to a challenge match for the premiership, irrespective of other major round results. However, in a special SAFA meeting on Wednesday 3 September, the association voted to disqualify Port Adelaide from the remainder of the season, stripping it of this right. At the same meeting, the association affirmed Port Adelaide's procedural objection that Kneebone's appointment was not per procedure, finding that only the full association, not the umpire's committee, had the power to appoint a non-association umpire to the association. Kneebone went on to umpire the following week's Grand Final.

At a separate meeting on 8 September, the formal matter of second place was discussed, with a conflict arising between the convention that the losing grand finalist (South Adelaide) be considered runners-up, but rule 29 stating that minor placings be decided on overall premiership points (Port Adelaide). The Association ruled South Adelaide be considered runners-up, relegating Port Adelaide to third.

Grand Final

References 

SAFA
South Australian National Football League seasons